Anil Mehta (born 26 September 1984) is a Bhartiya Janta Party (BJP) politician who is currently working as the Deputy Advocate General (DAG)  for State of Haryana in Punjab & Haryana High Court at Chandigarh. He is also representing the Hon’ble Chief Minister of Haryana in a programme called "CONNECT2CM", an initiative of its own kind by any State Government wherein the Chief Minister would have a direct dialogue with youth from the age group of 16 to 35. The whole idea to launch this programme is to have the first hand information from the youth, the future of India with regard to the working and betterment of the State Government.

Early life and education
Anil Mehta belongs to a Gaur Brahmin Family of District Ambala. He was born in 1984 to Smt. Suresh Mehta & Capt. Kul Bhushan Mehta at Military Hospital, Ambala Cantt although he belongs to a village named Badhauli in Tehsil Naraingarh, District Ambala in Haryana. His father has served Indian Army for 34 years and after his retirement, is presently settled at District Ambala only. 
He completed his school education from Army School, Ambala in science stream and was also the house captain of his house in school. Although after completing his intermediate in science stream he chose to study Law over Engineering and was admitted to one of the renowned & prestigious college, Army Institute of Law at Mohali, Punjab. He is also an alumnus of London School of Economics and Political Science wherein he studied Corporate Law and Governance.
He joined Bar Association of Punjab & Haryana High Court in July, 2008 and is a Practicing Lawyer since then practicing in Civil, Criminal & Corporate side. He is also a Managing Partner of a Law Firm name as Lex Solutions having its offices at Chandigarh and Delhi.

Career
He started his political career from "Akhil Bhartiya Adhivkta Parishad" an organization which runs under the aegis of Rashtriya Sawayamsewak Sangh (RSS) and thereafter he was appointed as the State Head of the Legal Cell of Bhartiya Janta Yuva Morcha (BJYM), the youth organization of Bhartiya Janta Party (2012 to October 2014).
After the formulation of new Government in State of Haryana on 26 October 2014, he served as P.S. to the Hon’ble Chief Minister, Manohar Lal Khattar for a short stint and thereafter was appointed as the Deputy Advocate General (DAG)  for the State of Haryana to defend the State Government in its legal matters before the Hon’ble High Court at Chandigarh

References

External links
 List of Chandigarh Law Officers

Bharatiya Janata Party politicians from Haryana
Haryana politicians
1984 births
Living people